2-Tetralone is an organic chemical compound with the molecular formula C10H10O.  This colourless oil is an intermediate in organic synthesis.  It is a ketone derivative of tetralin, a hydrogenated derivative of naphthalene.  A related compound is 1-tetralone.

2-Tetralone is prepared by reductive cleavage of 2-naphthyl ethers.

Applications
2-Tetralone is an intermediate in the synthesis of a variety of pharmaceutical drugs including L-687,384, nepinalone, napamezole, spirodone, and trioxifene.

References

Tetralones